Jean-Claude Deret, born Claude Breitman, (July 11, 1921 – December 12, 2016) was a French television writer, songwriter, actor, playwright, and author of children's books and detective novels.

Early life
Jean-Claude Deret was born as Claude Breitman on July 11, 1921. His family were secular Jews from Russia. One of his great-grandfathers was a psychiatrist. He lost a relative in The Holocaust.

Career
Deret started his career as a songwriter and singer in Saint-Germain-des-Prés in the late 1940s. By 1950, he emigrated to Quebec, where he became a theatre and television actor. Nine years later, in 1959, he returned to France and within a few years he created Thierry la Fronde, a television series. Between 1963 and 1966, he wrote 52 episodes.

Deret founded Le Théâtre du cercle, a theatre company in Saint-Gervais-la-Forêt. Additionally, he authored children's books and detective novels. He also wrote plays, including Samuel dans l'île, which was nominated for a Molière Award in 2006. Meanwhile, he continued to act, for example starring in Beautiful Memories in 2001. He also continued to write songs, and he performed at the Théâtre de Poche Montparnasse in April 2014. He wrote 50 songs over the course of his career. In 2016, he directed Salauds de pauvres, a short film about poor people in France.

Personal life and death
Deret had three children, including actress Zabou Breitman with Céline Léger.

Deret died in Paris on December 12, 2016, aged 95. He was cremated at the Père Lachaise Cemetery on December 17.

References

External links

1921 births
2016 deaths
Writers from Paris
French people of Russian-Jewish descent
French songwriters
Male songwriters
French television writers
Male television writers
21st-century French dramatists and playwrights
21st-century French male actors
21st-century French male writers
21st-century French screenwriters